{{Speciesbox
| status = VU
| status_system = IUCN3.1
| status_ref = 
| taxon = Gagata itchkeea
| authority = (Sykes, 1839)
| image = Nangra ichthya.jpg
| image2 = Gagata itchkeea Mintern 115.jpg
| synonyms = 
 Phractocephalus itchkeea Sykes, 1839 
 Bagrus itchkeea (Sykes, 1839) 
 Hemipimelodus itchkeea (Sykes, 1839) 
 Macrones itchkeea (Sykes, 1839) 
 Nangra itchkeea (Sykes, 1839) 
 Pimelodus itchkeea (Sykes, 1839) 
}}Gagata itchkeea'' is a species of sisorid catfish native to India and probably also to Pakistan. This species grows to a length of  TL.

References

External links

Sisoridae
Fish described in 1839
Fish of India
Fauna of Pakistan